Wheelchairs for Kids is a charity based in Perth, Western Australia. Wheelchairs for Kids manufactures rough terrain children's wheelchairs, donating them to children around the world. As of February 2015 they have manufactured and donated 30,000 such wheelchairs.

Wheelchairs for Kids was founded in 1998 with the assistance of Rotary International but raises the majority of funding from donations. No-one at Wheelchairs for Kids is remunerated, everyone is a volunteer, from the executive to its volunteers who manufacture the wheelchairs.

Wheelchairs for Kids produces its rough terrain wheelchairs in accordance to World Health Organization guidelines.

Last year its founding executive, volunteer CEO Gordon Hudson and volunteer workshop manager Brother Ollie were nominated for Australian of the Year awards. Gerry Georgatos was the volunteer manager of the Foundation arm of Wheelchairs for Kids.

References

Children's charities based in Australia
Medical and health organisations based in Western Australia